This is a list of UFC Light Heavyweight Fighters

Jon Jones
Ryan Bader
Tim Boetsch
Stephan Bonnar
Jason Brilz
Luiz Cane
Steve Cantwell
Phil Davis

Cyrille Diabate
Rashad Evans
Rich Franklin
Forrest Griffin
Alexander Gustafsson
Matt Hamill
Jared Hamman
Quinton Jackson

Jon Jones
Kyle Kingsbury
Lyoto Machida
Fabio Maldonado
Vladimir Matyushenko
Stanislav Nedkov
Antônio Rogério Nogueira
Tito Ortiz

Igor Pokrajac
Ricardo Romero
Mauricio Rua
Thiago Silva
Krzysztof Soszynski
James Te Huna
Brandon Vera